Phantom Thunderbolt is a 1933 American pre-Code Western film directed by Alan James.

Cast
Ken Maynard as Thunderbolt Kid
Frances Lee as Judy Lane
Frank Rice as Nevady
William Gould as "Red" Matthews
Bob Kortman as "One-Shot" Mallory
Frank Beal as Tobias Oldham
Wilfred Lucas as Mr. Eaton (railroad president)

External links

1933 films
American black-and-white films
1933 Western (genre) films
Films directed by Alan James
American Western (genre) films
Films produced by Samuel Bischoff
1930s English-language films
1930s American films